The 2020–21 TSV Hartberg season was the club's 75th season in existence and its third consecutive season in the top flight of Austrian football. In addition to the domestic league, Hartberg participated in this season's editions of the Austrian Cup and the UEFA Europa League. The season covered the period from 5 July 2020 to 30 June 2021.

Players

First-team squad
As of 16 October 2020.

Out on loan

Transfers

In

Out

Pre-season and friendlies

Competitions

Overview

Austrian Bundesliga

Regular stage

Results summary

Results by round

Matches
The league fixtures were announced on 9 July 2020.

Relegation round

Results summary

Results by round

Matches

European competition play-offs

Austrian Cup

UEFA Europa League

References

External links

TSV Hartberg seasons
Hartberg
Hartberg